The Kerala Brethren are a significant subset of the Open Brethren movement. In the South Indian State of Kerala, four Syrian Christian (Nasrani) men who came from traditional churches were baptised in 1898, and many of the Kerala Brethren consider this event to have been the start of their movement. Some 600 of the 2,200 Brethren assemblies (as their churches are generally called) in India are located in Kerala.

Characteristics
The Brethren have no central hierarchy or governing body. They see themselves as an informal network of like-minded autonomous local churches, not as a denomination in the organizational sense. Common support for itinerant preachers, publications, seminaries, and missions agencies, however, often leads to a high degree of cooperation among Brethren assemblies, and among Kerala's Christians, the Brethren are noted for their strong sense of identity.

The Brethren assemblies in Kerala are also known as "verpaatu sabhakal" due to their heavy emphasis on separation from the world for greater devotion to Jesus Christ. This emphasis on separation, although common among the Brethren throughout India and in some streams of the Brethren internationally, is particularly pronounced in Kerala.

History
Many Indian Christians believe that the Apostle Thomas brought the Christian message to India in 52AD. In the words of an Indian hymn, "...It was his mission to espouse India to the One-Begotten...." Some Indian Brethren disclaim their missionary origins, instead making a case for historical continuity with the First-Century converts of the Apostle Thomas, claiming that for several centuries  Christians on the Malabar coast (modern Kerala) followed what Brethren believe to have been the New Testament model of church organization and worship, with no clergy, and that clericalism began to creep in only after 345 AD, when seventy-two families belonging to seven Jewish clans followed Thomas of Cana from Iraq to Kodungalloor, which is now in Kerala. Thomas of Cana, they claim, brought in bishops and deacons, changing the practices of the Kerala Christians. This interpretation of history is not widely shared by non-Brethren Christians, however.

The modern Brethren movement was introduced into India in 1833 by Anthony Norris Groves, a dentist turned missionary who was one of the original Plymouth Brethren pioneers in Ireland. The Brethren movement began to take root in Kerala when Mathai Upadeshi, who had been an (Anglican) CMS evangelist from Tirunelveli, arrived in 1872.  Another early preacher was Justhus Joseph, also known as Vidwankutty, a Tamil Brahmin and also a CMS priest like Mathai Upadeshi. He arrived in Kerala in 1875, but his ministry declined after the failure of his prediction that Jesus Christ would return in 1881.

A second wave of growth among the Kerala Brethren started in 1894 with the arrival of V.D. David, better known in Kerala as Tamil David, and L.M. Wordsmith, the latter an Indian Tamil from Colombo, Sri Lanka. They were joined by Herbert Handley Bird, who established assemblies in Northern Kerala. They were helped by Baptist preacher and Keswick Convention speaker J.G. Gregson, who visited Kerala in 1896. Although a Baptist, he was sympathetic to Brethren viewpoints and helped to found the first Brethren assembly in Travancore, central Kerala. He also preached in Ayroor, near Kumbanad, paving the way for German missionary Volbrecht Nagel to conduct the first Brethren "meeting" (as they usually call their services) there on 19 March 1899.

Persecution

Meanwhile, a period of persecution from the older churches had broken out in 1897. Concerned about losing members, some priests in the Mar Thoma Syrian Church spoke out against the Brethren movement. P.C. John, a young Mar Thoma Christian influenced by Brethren ideas, was physically assaulted by his priest. John and his cousin, P.E. Mammen, who was a Mar Thoma priest, subsequently left that church and joined the Brethren. The Brethren further strengthened by continued defections from the Mar Thoma Church. K.V. Simon was excommunicated from the Mar Thoma Church in Edayaranmula for undergoing and practicing believer's baptism. After this event, which took place on 25 December 1915, Simon joined the Brethren movement. Sporadic persecution of the Brethren continued. Lonappan, an evangelist, and Kidangoor Thaipparambil Joseph were physically attacked in November 1921 by a mob which burned Bibles and destroyed their agricultural produce.

Brethren unity
1929 was a significant year, when a small group of Viyojitha assemblies that stemmed from the work of K.V. Simon came into fellowship with the wider Indian Brethren movement on 20 January. In practical terms, this meant that the Indian Brethren, who were similar in doctrine to the Open Brethren movement, recognized the Viyojitha Brethren as fellow-believers who shared the same principles of church order. Edwyn Hunter Noel of the Indian Brethren was instrumental in this coming together. They were subsequently joined by the Kerala Brethren, under the encouragement of P.E. Mammen.

Conventions and conferences
There is no General Convention for Brethren Assemblies in Kerala. Local assemblies throughout Kerala often conduct their own conventions and gospel meetings.

Charitable work
In 1906, Volbrecht Nagel, who had been leading the Brethren work at Kunnamkulam in Thrissur District on the Malabar Coast, purchased 75 acres of land and started a school and orphanage in Nellikkunnu, Thrissur. Tiruvalla Medical Mission (TMM) Hospitals have since been established at Tiruvalla, Manthamaruthy, & Vazhoor and the College of Nursing at Tiruvalla.

Schools/colleges
 Brethren Bible School, Kumbanad
 Brethren Bible Institute, Pathanamthitta (Offering B.Th., M.B.S., M.Div. & M.Th.) www.bbipta.com, bbi@bbiindia.org
 Brethren English Medium High School, Kumbanad.
 Clarence High School, Bangalore
 Noel Memorial High School & UP School, Kumbanad.
 Noel Memorial High School & UP School, Kariamplave.
 Noel Memorial U P School, Kalanjoor, 
 Noel Memorial Upper Primary School, Keekozhur,
 Noel Memorial Upper Primary School, Edayaranmula,
 Noel Memorial Upper Primary School, Kangazha,
 Noel memorial LP Chethackal, Ranny,
 Noel Memorial Lower Primary School, [Kanakappalam],
 Noel Memorial Lower Primary School, [Thrikkannamangal (Kottarakkara)],
 Noel Memorial Lower Primary School (N.M.L.P.S), Vilangara, Kottarakkara
 Noel Memorial Lower Primary School, Oottupara,
 Noel Memorial Lower Primary School, Mannarathara,
 Noel Memorial Lower Primary School, Sabarimankal,
 Noel Memorial Lower Primary School, Uthimood,
 Noel Memorial Lower Primary School, Paamala,
 Noel Memorial Lower Primary School, Pampady,
 Noel Memorial Lower Primary School, Mylapra,
 Noel Memorial Lower Primary School, Kariamplave
 TMM Hospital College of Nursing, Thiruvalla
 Hope Academy of Theology and Sciences, Bhopal
 Rehoboth Theological Institute (RTI), Nellikunnu, Trissur.
 Madurai Bible School & College, Madurai.

Mission funds
 Kerala Evangelistic Missionary (KEM) Fund
 General Gospel Fund
 Gospel Missions of India
 Gospel Fellowship Trust of India
 Hope Assembly Workers Fund (HAWF)
 Stewards Association in India

Homes for the elderly
 Brethren Mercy Trust, Kumbanad
 Rehoboth Old Age Home, Nellikkunnu

References and sources
Brethren Wiki BrethrenPedia
Thiruvalla Medical Missions
Keralabrethren.net History page
Missionaryvoice.org
Brethren institutions
 Mahaakavi K. V. Simon, History of the Malankara Brethren Churches (malankarayile verpaatu sabhakalute charithram) – republished by Sathyam Publications, Tiruvalla, Kerala, India. in Feb 1999.
 Lang, G. H., The History and Diaries of an Indian Christian: J. C. Aroolappen, USA, Schoettle Publishing Co., Inc., 1988

Kerala Brethren pioneers
 Herbert Handley Bird
 Volbrecht_Nagel  
 Edwyn Hunter Noel, (son of PB historian Napoleon Noel)
 Mahakavi K.V. Simon
 Y. Ezekiel
 Alex Souter
 M.E. Cherian, Madurai
 T.K. Samuel
 K.V.Cheru
 J.M. Davies
 Silas Fox, aka "The White Fox of Andhra"
 J.G. Gregson
 P.C. John Upadeshi
 P.C. Joseph - Jospeh Chethackal
 P.C. Joseph - Poikayil Joseph 
 K.G. Kurien
 V.T. Mathai
 M.M. John (Kumbanad)
 A.A. Chacko
 T.A. Kurien - Sagar
 P.E. Mammen, "Kumbanattachen" - former Vicar of Kumbanad and Eraviperoor Marthoma parishes
 Mammen Kurien
 E.J. Mathew
 A.T. Mathew, (Gudalur, Nilgiris)
 K.G. Thomas
 Dr. Poulose Thudian
 Avarachan Upadeshi
 E.P. Varghese
 T.T Scariah

See also
Assemblies Jehovah Shammah
Indian Brethren
Open Brethren
Plymouth Brethren
K. V. Simon
P.C. John

References

External links
Kerala Brethren Assembly 
Kerala Brethren Assembly-Forum 
Kerala Brethren 
Kerala Brethren discussion forum
brethrenassembly.com 
Adelphoi News.com
Hope Academy of Theology and Sciences, Bhopal 

Christianity in Kerala
Christian missions in India
Plymouth Brethren
Religious organizations established in 1898
1898 establishments in India